The National Museum-Preserve "Battle for Kyiv 1943", is a museum dedicated to the Kyiv Strategic Offensive Operation of autumn 1943. The museum is located on the outskirts of the village of Novi Petrivtsi, Vyshhorod Raion of Kyiv Oblast, Ukraine. 

The curator of the museum is the Ministry of Culture of the Kyiv Regional State Administration. The current museum director is Ivan Petrovich Vìkovan. The Museum was created by the Council of People's Commissars of Ukraine and the Central Committee of VKP (b) as a museum-preserve "The Battle for Kyiv 1943" on March 20, 1945. To date, the museum has been visited by more than 10 million people from 85 countries of the world. The museum maintains stationary and mobile exhibitions. The museum hosts a number of ceremonies to honor the memory of the heroes of the Battle of the Dnieper, and various other events related to its mission.

Exposition

The museum exposition tells about the events of the autumn of 1943, the Battle of the Dnieper and the Lyutezh Offensive Operation during the Battle of Kyiv. The exhibit includes archaeological, ethnographic, numismatic collection, art crafts, paintings, sculptures, photos, and documents of the Eastern Front of World War II.

The historical-cultural complex includes:

 A territory with an area of 8 hectares, the observation points of the 1st Ukrainian Front Army General Nikolai Fyodorovich Vatutin, Commander of the 38th Army Kyrylo Moskalenko, a member of the Military Council of the front Lieutenant General Nikita Khrushchev, Commander of the 3rd Guards Tank Army Pavlo Rybalko;
 Samples of military equipment from the time of the war;
 Monument to the liberators of Kyiv. This monument that commemorates the liberation of Kyiv from the Nazis was built by decision of the Government of the Ukrainian Soviet Socialist Republic on March 28, 1957. The architects Abraham Miletsky and V. V. Baklanov together with the sculptor Iván Pershudchev were in charge of the work;
 Diorama titled "The Battle for Kyiv Lyutezh Bridgehead 1943." Which opened on May 5, 1980. The dimensions of the canvas are 29 x 7. Created by M. S. Prisekin;
 Memorial complex in the village of Novi Petrivtsi;
 Museum-diorama of 1100 meters. This section has showrooms that exhibit dioramas. It was opened in honor of the 50th anniversary of the liberation of kyiv in 1993;
 Monument to the heroes of the bridgehead of Liutz. Built in 1983 in honor of the 40th anniversary of the Battle of the Dnieper and the liberation of Kyiv from Nazi invaders. There's a big commemorative sign that reads: "To the heroes of the Liutz bridgehead";
 The wall of memory. It has high reliefs of heroes from the war. It was established for the 70th anniversary of the liberation of Kyiv in 2013.

Scientific work
The staff of the museum are working with research materials of war and the study of materials from the history of Kyiv Polissya. Savior of the Transfiguration monastery is a monastery of the Zaporozhian Cossacks during the 17th and 18th centuries.

Gallery

References

1945 establishments in Ukraine
Museums established in 1945
Museums in Kyiv
Preserve Battle for Kyiv 1943
World War II museums
Military and war museums in Ukraine
World War II memorials in Ukraine
Buildings and structures destroyed during the 2022 Russian invasion of Ukraine